Vicente is an Italian, Spanish, and Portuguese name. Like its French variant, Vincent, it is derived from the Latin name Vincentius meaning "conquering" (from Latin vincere, "to conquer").

Vicente may refer to:

Location
São Vicente, Cape Verde - an island in Cape Verde

People

Given Name
 Vicente Aleixandre (1898–1984), Spanish writer, Nobel Prize laureate
 Vicente Álvarez Travieso, first alguacil mayor (1731–1779) of San Antonio, Texas
 Vicente Aranda (1926–2015), Spanish film director, screenwriter and producer
 Vicente del Bosque (b. 1950), former Spanish footballer and former manager of the Spain national football team
 José Vicente Feliz, American settler
 Vicente Fernández (1940–2021), Mexican retired singer, actor, and film producer
 Vicente Fox Quesada (b. 1942), Mexican politician who served as President of Mexico
 Juan Vicente Gómez (1857–1935), Venezuelan military dictator
 Vicente Guaita (b. 1987), Spanish footballer
 Vicente Guerrero (1782–1831), one of the leading revolutionary generals of the Mexican War of Independence
 Vicente Henriques (b. 1978), Brazilian water polo player
 Vicente Lim (1888–1944), Filipino brigadier general and World War II hero 
 Vicente Luque (b. 1991), American-born Brazilian mixed martial artist who competes in the welterweight division of the Ultimate Fighting Championship

 Vicente de Paula Neto (b. 1979), Brazilian footballer
 Vicente Pérez Rosales (1807–1886), Chilean politician, traveller and colonization agent
 Vicente Rodríguez (b. 1981), Spanish international footballer
 Vicente Seguí Porres, (b. 1978) Spanish singer winner of "Operación Triunfo" 3rd series in 2003
 Vicente Y. Sotto (1877–1950), Filipino politician
 Vicente "Tito" Sotto III (born 1948), Filipino actor, comedian, politician, and singer-songwriter; grandson of Vicente Sotto
 Vicente Ten (b. 1966), Spanish politician
 Vicente Yáñez Pinzón (c.1460–1523), Spanish navigator, explorer and conquistador

Surname

Bruno Leonardo Vicente, (b. 1989) Brazilian footballer
Esteban Vicente (1904–2001), abstract expressionist
Gil Vicente (1465–1537) Portuguese playwright and poet
Mariana Vicente, (b. 1989), Miss Universe Puerto Rico 2010
Nieves García Vicente (born 1955), Spanish chess master
Vicente (footballer, born 1983), full name Wellington da Silva Vicente, Brazilian football left-back

Other uses
Tropical Storm Vicente, the name used for multiple tropical cyclones in the northern Pacific Ocean

See also
Vincente (disambiguation)

Spanish masculine given names
Spanish-language surnames
Portuguese-language surnames
Surnames from given names